Awang Abdul Aziz bin Juned is a Muslim scholar and the current  Grand Mufti of Brunei. As a Grand Mufti, he is the most senior and most influential Sunni Muslim religious and legal authority in the nation. He was appointed by the Sultan in 1994.

References

External links
 

Bruneian Muslims
Living people
State Muftis of Brunei
1941 births